Degenerate Art is a 2011 documentary by American pipe maker Aaron Golbert, aka Marble Slinger, on the art and culture associated with glass pipes used for smoking cannabis. Its title references the German expression degenerate art, an invective used to denigrate modern art during the Nazi regime. The film, which was featured at the SXSW Festival in Austin, Texas in 2012, follows the history of glass pipe-making culture and the tremendous influence of Bob Snodgrass.

References

External links 
 Degenerate Art - Official website
 

2011 films
2011 documentary films
American documentary films about cannabis
Documentary films about the visual arts
Documentary films about drugs
Glass art
2010s American films